Thunder Run is a wooden roller coaster at the Kentucky Kingdom amusement park in Louisville, Kentucky. The ride originally operated from August 1990 through to October 2009, when then-operators Six Flags abandoned the park. After remaining closed since 2009, Thunder Run reopened in May 2014 when Kentucky Kingdom reopened under new operators.

The ride was manufactured by Dinn Corporation and designed by Curtis D. Summers and John Fetterman.

History
Kentucky Kingdom opened on May 23, 1987, leasing  at the Kentucky Exposition Center property. The Texas investors who operated the park filed it for bankruptcy after only one season of operation. The Ed Hart-led Themeparks LLC firm purchased the rights to operate the park in 1989, reopening the park the following year. As part of the reopening the new operators added a collection of new rides including Thunder Run, which opened in August 1990. Early in Thunder Run's operating life, one of the cars uncoupled while climbing the lift hill and the ride's lap bars were found to be unsafe. No injuries were reported from these incidents. The original ride was retracked by Martin & Vleminckx prior to its closure in 2009.

Thunder Run operated until the end of the 2009 season which ended on November 1. On February 4, 2010, amid a corporate bankruptcy, Six Flags closed the park due to the rejection of an amended lease by the Kentucky State Fair Board. Eventually, on June 27, 2013, a group of investors led by Ed Hart negotiated an agreement to reopen the park with a planned investment of $50 million. Rocky Mountain Construction was hired to refurbish the coaster, resulting in replacement of the existing wooden track. On October 10, 2013, Kentucky Kingdom invited members of the media and amusement industry to ride the refurbished Thunder Run. The ride reopened to the public on May 24, 2014. After the 2016 season, Kentucky Kingdom announced that Thunder Run would receive a new train from the Philadelphia Toboggan Company for the 2017 season. This train replaced the single train that was first put into service in 1990.

Characteristics
The ride operates with a single train featuring six cars. Each car seats riders in two rows of two, totalling 24 riders per train. Thunder Run features 70 degree banked turns.

Thunder Runs design was originally intended for Americana Amusement Park. In 1986 John Fetterman presented the design to park manager Ron Berni. Berni contacted Dennis Starkey of Curtis D. Summers's engineering firm. The coaster was never built for Americana and Berni transferred to Kentucky Kingdom in 1989.

The design was later used as the foundation for the International Coasters' roller coaster located at Carowinds and formerly at Kings Dominion named Hurler.

Ride experience

Thunder Run features a double out and back layout. It begins with a left turn out of the station. This leads to the  chain lift hill. Once at the top, riders go down a small dip and along a 180 degree turn to the left. The first drop of  leads into a near-ground level 70-degree banked turn to the left. A series of small camelback hills are followed by a turnaround. The train proceeds back towards the station with another hill. This process repeats a second time leading back into the brake run and station.

Reception
In 1993 and 1994, Thunder Run was cited by Amusement Business as the "Most Terrifying Roller Coaster" on a top 10 list. Inside Track magazine ranked Thunder Run as the "fourth best of its kind in the nation." In 2007, the Lexington Herald-Leader described the ride as having "a few nice drops and that jerky, clicking wooden coaster feel that some people love, but it never gets too wild." Tim O'Brien, formerly of Amusement Business, rode the inaugural run of the ride in 1990, as well as the first cycle of the refurbished ride in 2013. O'Brien describes the updated ride as "a better ride today than it was back then," commending the ride's ability to give a classic wooden roller coaster feel, yet run smoothly. He stated Thunder Run "is one of the top wooden roller coasters in the world."

In Amusement Today's annual Golden Ticket Awards, Thunder Run has appeared four times between 2001 and 2004. It debuted at position 34 in 2001 before dropping to 49 in 2004.

Mitch Hawker's Wooden Coaster Poll was an annual survey of roller coasters from around the world. In that poll, Thunder Run entered at position 30 in 1994, maintaining an average of 54 for the 17 years that followed. The ride's ranking in subsequent polls is shown in the table below.

References

External links
 Kentucky Kingdom's official website
 
 

Kentucky Kingdom
Roller coasters introduced in 1990
Roller coasters in Kentucky